Lamam may be,

Lamam language, Vietnam
Lamam District, Laos